The Zambia women's national football team represents Zambia in women's association football. The following is a list of match results since 2020.

2020

2021

2022

 
 

Source :global sport

See also 
 Zambia national football team results (2020–present)

Notes

References 

Women's national association football team results
results